Spatter may refer to:

 Spattering, a process in which synthetic fabrics are coated with a fine layer of metal
 Food spatter: the splashing and scattering of oil droplets during frying. Anti-spattering substances are used by food technology to reduce this phenomenon. Also spatter can be produced in microwave oven by the liquids of the food. 
The small, unwanted droplets of molten metal emitted during welding.
 Blood spatter
 Spatter cone, volcano cone
 Spatterdock, water plant

See also
 
 
 Spat (disambiguation)
 Spatterdash (disambiguation)
 Splatter (disambiguation)